Charles Henry Robert Thias (November 15, 1879 – November 19, 1922) was an American tug of war athlete who competed in the 1904 Summer Olympics. In the 1904 Olympics he won a bronze medal as a member of Southwest Turnverein of Saint Louis No. 2 team, which is officially considered a mixed team. He was born in Illinois and died in San Francisco, California.

References

External links
profile

1879 births
1922 deaths
Olympic tug of war competitors of the United States
Tug of war competitors at the 1904 Summer Olympics
Olympic bronze medalists for the United States in tug of war
Medalists at the 1904 Summer Olympics